Michelle Dean (born 1979) is a journalist and critic from Canada.

She received a B.A. in history from McGill University in 2002 and a law degree in 2005. She worked at White & Case from 2005 to 2010. She received a master's degree in Law from the University of Toronto in 2011.

She currently lives and works in the United States.

Dean was honored in 2016 with the National Book Critics' Circle's Nona Balakian Citation for Excellence in Reviewing. Her work has appeared in The New Yorker, The New Republic, The New York Times Magazine, and Elle. Her first book, Sharp: The Women Who Made an Art of Having an Opinion, was published by Grove Atlantic in 2018.

She is also the co-creator and executive producer of the Hulu series The Act. The show was based on Dean's reporting.

References 

1979 births
Living people
Canadian women journalists
McGill University Faculty of Law alumni
Year of birth uncertain
Canadian women non-fiction writers